Capoompeta is a national park in New South Wales, Australia,  north of Sydney. The park is mountainous with dry forests and rainforests, with fern basins and with important areas for wildlife. Apart from the picturesque roads leading to Glen Innes (68km), Deepwater (28km) and Tenterfield (42km) there are no facilities in the park.

See also
 Protected areas of New South Wales
 High Conservation Value Old Growth forest

References

National parks of New South Wales
Protected areas established in 1999
1999 establishments in Australia